Pūčkornės is a village in  (Valkininkai) eldership, Varėna district municipality, Alytus County, southeastern Lithuania. According to the 2001 census, the village has a population of 128 people. At the 2011 census, the population was 20.

References

Villages in Varėna District Municipality